Crystal Allison Langhorne (born October 27, 1986) is an American former basketball player of the Women's National Basketball Association (WNBA). She played for the University of Maryland Terrapins.  In 2008 she was drafted by the Washington Mystics.

High school
Langhorne is a graduate of Willingboro High School in Willingboro, New Jersey. Langhorne was named a WBCA All-American. She participated in the 2004 WBCA High School All-America Game, where she scored five points, and earned MVP honors.

College
In 2006, she helped the Terrapins win the NCAA Championship, and in 2007 she starred in helping the USA win the FIBA World Championship under 21 for women. She is the first player in the University of Maryland's history to score 2,000 points and grab 1,000 rebounds for either the men's or women's teams, and only the 106th women's college basketball player to do so.

Her jersey was retired and raised to the rafters at the Comcast Center during her last regular season home game.  She was the first Maryland player to have her jersey raised to the rafters while still active.

At Maryland, she majored in communications.

College statistics

Source

Professional career

WNBA
In 2008, Langhorne was drafted 6th overall by the Washington Mystics in the 2008 WNBA draft. In her rookie season, Langhorne was a reserve for the Mystics, playing 34 games with 6 starts, averaging 4.8 ppg.

In her second season, Langhorne started in 22 of 34 games played and averaged 12 ppg, she would win Most Improved Player award for that season.

In 2010, Langhorne officially became the Mystics' starting power forward. During the season, she scored a career-high 31 points in a win against the Phoenix Mercury. By the end of the season, she averaged 16.3 ppg and also averaged a career-high in rebounds, she would also be named to the All-WNBA Second Team. 

In 2011, Langhorne averaged a career-high in scoring with 18.2 ppg and was voted into the 2011 WNBA All-Star Game, making it her first career all-star game appearance.

In 2012, Langhorne re-signed with the Mystics once her rookie contract expired. Langhorne would play two more seasons with the Mystics before being traded to the Seattle Storm in 2014, in exchange for Bria Hartley and Tianna Hawkins.

Langhorne would continue to be a starter with the Storm, as she averaged 12.9 in her first season with the team.

In 2016, Langhorne re-signed with the Storm in free agency. During the season, Langhorne set the franchise record for field goals in a game without a miss, when she scored 18 points on 8-for-8 field goal shooting in a win against the Connecticut Sun.

In the 2017 season, Langhorne achieved a new career-high in field shooting percentage and averaged 12.4 ppg. During the season, Langhorne would set a new franchise record for field goals in a game without a miss, by scoring 20 points on 9-of-9 field goal shooting in a win against the Atlanta Dream.

In 2018, Langhorne re-signed again with the Storm. Langhorne would come off the bench for the Storm, playing behind Natasha Howard. The Storm finished with a league best 26–8 record, receiving a double-bye to the semi-finals. They defeated the Phoenix Mercury in a five-game series advancing to the Finals. In the Finals, the Storm would win the championship after sweeping the Washington Mystics.

USA Basketball
Langhorne was a member of the USA Women's U19 team which  competed in the 2005 U19 World Championships in Tunis, Tunisia. The USA team won all eight games, winning the gold medal. Langhorne led the team in scoring with 16.6 points per game and hit nine out of nine field goals attempts in the opening round game against South Korea.

Overseas
Langhorne played in Slovakia for Good Angels during the off-season from 2014 to 2016. In 2016, Langhorne signed Daqing Rural Commercial Bank of the Women's Chinese Basketball Association for the 2016-17 off-season. In 2017, Langhorne signed with Uniqua Sopron, a Hungarian club for the 2017-18 off-season.

Post-basketball career 
After 13 years in the WNBA, Langhorne retired in 2021 and began a community engagement role with the Seattle Storm. She is currently the director of community engagement for Force4Change, the Storm's social justice platform that focuses on voter registration, the amplification of Black women; BIPOC and LGBTQ+ leaders; and organizations serving Black communities.

WNBA career statistics

Regular season

|-
| align="left" | 2008
| align="left" | Washington
| 34 || 6 || 15.6 || .624 || .000 || .549 || 4.0 || 0.4 || 0.4 || 0.1 || 1.0 || 4.8
|-
| align="left" | 2009
| align="left" | Washington
| 34 || 22 || 29.8 || .574 || .000 || .689  || 7.9 || 0.9 || 1.0 || 0.3 || 2.2 || 12.0
|-
| align="left" | 2010
| align="left" | Washington
| 34 || 34 || 34.1 || .589 || .167  || .772 || 9.7 || 1.1 || 0.8 || 0.2 || 2.6 || 16.3
|-
| align="left" | 2011
| align="left" | Washington
| 31 || 31 || 34.3 || .534 || .125 || .711 || 7.6 || 1.6 || 1.2 || 0.4 || 3.2 || 18.2
|-
| align="left" | 2012
| align="left" | Washington
| 31 || 31 || 32.2 || .562 || .125  || .641 || 6.3 || 1.4 || 1.4 || 0.1 || 2.4 || 14.7
|-
| align="left" | 2013
| align="left" | Washington
| 34 || 34 || 28.6 || .515 || .125 || .651 || 7.2 || 1.3 || 0.9 || 0.2 || 2.3 || 12.0
|-
| align="left" | 2014
| align="left" | Seattle
| 34 || 34 || 28.9 || .571 || .667 || .658 || 7.4 || 1.0 || 0.6 || 0.3 || 2.0 || 12.9
|-
| align="left" | 2015
| align="left" | Seattle
| 34  || 34  || 25.7 || .545 || .000 || .750 || 5.7 || 0.8 || 0.9 || 0.4 || 2.0 || 11.1
|-
| align="left" | 2016
| align="left" | Seattle
| 33 || 33 || 25.6 || .630 || 1.000 || .759 || 5.5 || 1.4 || 0.7 || 0.3 || 1.5 || 9.5
|-
| align="left" |2017
| align="left" |Seattle
| 34 || 34 || 28.4 || .647 || .500 || .735 || 6.1 || 1.5 || 	0.6 || 0.4 || 1.6 || 12.4
|-
|style="text-align:left;background:#afe6ba;"| 2018†
| align="left" |Seattle
| 26 || 1 || 13.9 || .500  || .000 || .889 || 3.0 || 0.3 || 0.3 || 0.1 || 0.9 || 4.6
|-
| align="left" | Career
| align="left" |11 years, 2 teams
| 359 || 294 || 27.2 || .569 || .182 || .701 || 6.5 || 1.1 || 0.8 || 0.3 || 2.0 || 11.8

Postseason

|-
| align="left" | 2009
| align="left" | Washington
| 2 || 2 || 39.6 || .700 || .000 || .625 || 10.0 || 0.5 || 0.5 || 0.5|| 3.0 || 16.5
|-
| align="left" | 2010
| align="left" | Washington
| 2 || 2 || 34.8 || .458 || .000 || 1.000 || 8.0 || 1.5 || 0.0 || 2.0 || 2.5 || 13.5
|-
| align="left" | 2013
| align="left" | Washington
| 3 || 3 || 27.9 || .400 || .000 || .333 || 8.0 || 2.0 || 0.0 || 0.0 || 1.3 || 5.7
|-
| align="left" | 2016
| align="left" |Seattle
| 1 || 1 || 20.8 || .333 || .000 || 1.000 || 7.0 ||2.0 || 0.0 || 1.0||2.0|| 7.0
|-
| align="left" |2017
| align="left" |Seattle
| 1 ||	1 || 21.7 || .500 || .000 || .000 || 3.0 ||0.0|| 0.0 || 0.0||0.0||2.0
|-
|style="text-align:left;background:#afe6ba;"|2018†
| align="left" |Seattle
| 8 || 0 || 10.3 || .520 || .000 || .500 || 2.9 ||0.5|| 0.1 || 0.1||0.2||3.8
|-
| align="left" | Career
| align="left" |6 years, 2 teams
| 17 || 9 || 21.0 || .505 || .000 || .667 || 5.5 || 0.9 || 0.1 || 0.4 || 1.1 || 6.8

See also
 List of WNBA career rebounding leaders

References

External links 
 Maryland Terrapins bio
 WNBA bio
 USA Basketball profile

1986 births
Living people
All-American college women's basketball players
American expatriate basketball people in China
American expatriate basketball people in Hungary
American expatriate basketball people in Slovakia
American women's basketball players
Basketball players from New York City
Centers (basketball)
Heilongjiang Dragons players
Maryland Terrapins women's basketball players
McDonald's High School All-Americans
People from Willingboro Township, New Jersey
Parade High School All-Americans (girls' basketball)
Power forwards (basketball)
Seattle Storm players
Sportspeople from Burlington County, New Jersey
Sportspeople from Queens, New York
Washington Mystics draft picks
Washington Mystics players
Willingboro High School alumni
Women's National Basketball Association All-Stars